Southern Water is the private utility company responsible for the public wastewater collection and treatment in Hampshire, the Isle of Wight, West Sussex, East Sussex and Kent, and for the public water supply and distribution in approximately half of this area. Some areas within the Southern Water region are supplied by a number of smaller water supply companies. Southern Water supplies an area totalling 4,450 sq. km. and serves 2.26 million customers.

Southern Water is regulated under the Water Industry Act 1991 and since 2007 has been owned by Greensands Holdings Limited, a consortium of investors representing infrastructure investment funds, pension funds and private equity. Currently the largest shareholders are JP Morgan Asset Management (40%), UBS Asset Management (22%), Hermes Infrastructure Funds (21%) and Whitehelm Capital (8%).

In June 2019, Ofwat proposed a fine of £126 million as a result of Southern Water's failures to operate its wastewater treatment works properly and deliberately misreporting its performance. Ofwat found that failings had resulted in unpermitted and premature spills of wastewater from treatment works, with wastewater being released into the environment before going through the required processes.

In 2020, Southern Water pleaded guilty to 51 offences related to dumping untreated sewage into the sea, and was fined £90m.

History

Origins 
The Water Act 1973 resulted in the formation of the Southern Water Authority (SWA), taking the responsibility away from the local authorities. Nevertheless, the SWA maintained a regional management approach, retaining three separate regional headquarters:
Otterbourne near Winchester, covering Hampshire and the Isle of Wight
Falmer near Brighton, covering East Sussex and West Sussex
Chatham, covering Kent.

The authority took over the assets and duties of the following water undertakings:
Hampshire River Authority
Sussex River Authoritiy
Kent River Authority (except the area draining into the Thames above Greenhithe)
Brighton Corporation
Hastings Corporation
Southampton Corporation
Tunbridge Wells Corporation
Winchester Corporation
Worthing Corporation
Isle of Wight River and Water Authority
Medway Water Board
North West Sussex Water Board
Thanet Water Board

Privatisation 
In 1989 the ten publicly owned water and sewerage authorities were privatised. This was achieved by transferring the water supply and sewerage assets, and the relevant staff, of the Southern Water Authority into the limited company Southern Water Services Ltd. Privatisation was accompanied by the raising of capital by floating parent companies on the London Stock Exchange, a one-off injection of public capital, the write off of significant government debt, and the provision of capital tax allowances.

Takeovers 
In 1996 Southern Water was purchased in a hostile takeover bid by Scottish Power. Southern Water assets were considerably impacted during the period under Scottish Power. During this period, the bulk of in-house scientific laboratory services and assets were shut down, dismantled and sold off. In 2002, Scottish Power sold the company to First Aqua Limited.

In October 2007, Greensands Investments Limited purchased Southern Water Capital Limited, the owners of Southern Water Services Limited.

Southern Water today 
The three main office buildings continue to be used for the administration and management of the company, along with a newer building in the West Durrington area of Worthing, West Sussex, which is the company's registered headquarters and houses the company's call centre and control centre.

Today the company supplies drinking water to roughly 1.1 million properties through its 91 water treatment works and 13,870 kilometres of water mains. Wastewater is treated by the company's network of 365 wastewater treatment works and 39,594 kilometres of sewers. Also, the treatment of sludge results in a nutrient-rich granulated fertiliser which the company sells to the farming industry.

Southern Water has also opened up some of their activities to the public. This includes the company running guided tours of the Victorian sewers of Brighton and Hove and public access to Bewl Water, one of the largest reservoirs in England. The historic Twyford Waterworks near Winchester is leased to the Twyford Waterworks Trust, who open it on selected days during the year.

Performance

Legal issues

2005-2007 
In 2007, Ofwat announced its intention to fine Southern Water £20.3 million for 'deliberate misreporting' and failing to meet guaranteed standards of service to customers. The misreporting resulted in Southern Water being able to raise its prices by more than it should have done. Southern Water Chief Executive Les Dawson said: "Today's announcement draws a line under a shameful period in the company's history" and "we accept this fine - we have no arguments with it".

2009-2011 
Crawley Magistrates' Court heard that the Environment Agency received calls from members of the public after dead fish were seen in the Sunnyside Stream in East Grinstead on 30 August 2009. The court also heard that a similar incident occurred along the same sewer line some 4 years earlier in September 2005. Following an investigation, in June 2010 Southern Water was fined £3,000 after it admitted polluting 2 km of the Sussex stream with raw sewage, killing up to a hundred brown trout and devastating the fish population for the second time in five years.

In 2011 Southern Water Ltd was fined £25,000 when sewage flooded into Southampton water.

The company was ordered to pay £10,000 in fines and costs after sewage seeped into a stream at Beltinge in Kent.

A leak of sewage from Southern Water's plant at Hurstpierpoint pumping station, West Sussex, lead to fines and costs of £7,200 in 2011.

Southern Water was fined £50,000 in April 2011 for two offences relating to unscreened discharges into Langstone Harbour, Hampshire, between November 2009 and April 2010.

2014-2016 
In November 2014 Southern Water were fined £500,000 and agreed to pay costs of £19,224 at Canterbury Crown Court after an Environment Agency investigation found that untreated sewage was discharged into the Swalecliffe Brook, polluting a 1.2 km stretch of the watercourse and killing local wildlife. Although sewage directly polluted a 1.2 km stretch, the Swalecliffe Brook flows through the Thanet Coast Site of Special Scientific Interest (SSSI) before it joins the north Kent coast to the east of Whitstable.

In December 2016 Southern Water was fined a record £2,000,000 for flooding beaches in Kent with raw sewage. As a result of a series of failures at a wastewater pumping station, raw sewage flooded on to beaches, forcing Thanet district council to close the beaches to the public for nine days including during the Queen's Diamond Jubilee bank holiday weekend. The Environment Agency called the event “catastrophic”, with tampons, condoms and other debris costing more than £400,000 to clean up. The Environment Agency said that the discharge along a considerable length of coastline, resulted in a risk to public health and negative impact in an area heavily reliant on the tourism industry. A judge at Maidstone Crown Court said that Southern Water’s repeat offending was “wholly unacceptable”. Following the investigation, Southern Water director Simon Oates apologised unreservedly for the failure of the wastewater plant.

2019 
In June 2019, the Water Services Regulation Authority (Ofwat) announced its intentions to issue Southern Water with a financial penalty of £37.7 million reduced exceptionally to £3 million for significant breaches of its licence conditions and statutory duties. Following a lengthy investigation, Ofwat concluded that Southern Water deliberately misreported data about the performance of its wastewater treatment works. The investigation concluded that Southern Water had failed: to have adequate systems of planning, governance and internal controls in place to manage its wastewater treatment works; to accurately report information about the performance of these works; and to properly carry out its statutory duties as a sewerage undertaker, to make provision for effectually dealing with and treating wastewater. Ofwat found that Southern Water's failure to operate its wastewater treatment works properly resulted in unpermitted and premature spills of wastewater from its treatment works, with wastewater being released into the environment before going through the required processes.

Following the investigation, Southern Water agreed to pay customers approximately £123 million by 2024, partly a payment of price review underperformance penalties the company avoided paying in the period 2010 to 2017 and some of which is a payment to customers for the failures found in Ofwat's investigation. In response to Ofwat's findings, Southern Water announced that following its own internal review, which highlighted multiple failures between 2010 and 2017, it was 'profoundly sorry' and 'working very hard to understand past failings and implement the changes required' to ensure it meets the standards its customers deserve.

2021 
In 2020, Southern Water pleaded guilty to 51 offences related to polluting the water on the coasts of Kent and Sussex with untreated sewage between 1 January 2010 and 31 December 2015.  It was described as "the worst case brought by the Environment Agency in its history." Over the period, the company made 8,400 illegal discharges of raw sewage into coastal waters. It also allowed storm tanks to be kept full and turn septic, instead of putting their contents through the required treatment process. In one plant alone, 746m litres were released into Southampton Water. Southern Water failed to report its illegal discharges to the regulator, but as the quality of shellfish on the Kent coast failed to meet quality standards due to the high levels of faecal contamination the Environment Agency began to investigate. The company was fined £90m for deliberately dumping billions of litres of raw sewage into the sea and the judge stated that the offences had been committed deliberately by Southern Water's directors.

Work in the community

Southern Water has an extensive sponsorship programme for charities, schools and community groups which includes:

 The Learn to Swim scheme which has helped teach more than 600,000 children to swim since it began in 1992
 A Community Volunteering Programme which allows employees to spend two days paid leave working for their chosen charity or community project each year
 Awarding grants to a wide range of organisations and community groups for environmental projects and other initiatives
 Holding major fundraising events like the annual Charity Race Day which has raised £390,000 for good causes since 2007
 Offering free educational talks to schools and community groups about the water cycle, water treatment and water for health.

References

External links 
 

Water companies of England
Companies based in West Sussex
Former nationalised industries of the United Kingdom
1973 establishments in England